Oleksandr Ovcharenko (born 17 October 2001) is a Ukrainian tennis player.

Ovcharenko has a career high ATP singles ranking of 377 achieved on 26 December 2022. He also has a career high ATP doubles ranking of 420 achieved on 10 October 2022.

Ovcharenko represents Ukraine at the Davis Cup, where he has a W/L record of 0–1.

Tour finals

Singles

Doubles

References

External links

2001 births
Living people
Ukrainian male tennis players
Sportspeople from Kyiv